The Herefordshire flag is flag of the English county of Herefordshire. It was registered with the Flag Institute on 2 November 2019.



Council banner and proposed designs
 
In absence of a registered flag, the banner of arms of Herefordshire Council is sometimes used, with it having been flown alongside the Union Flag above the Department for Communities and Local Government. It features a river running through a red background with a lion passant guardant (sometimes called a "leopard") above and the head of a bull below.

An alternative design for a flag has been popular, despite being created by a former student as an internet joke, and is sold at the Hereford Tourist Centre.

In January 2019, the Herefordshire Flag Committee, working in conjunction with the council and the Flag Institute, announced plans for an open competition to create a registered flag with a deadline for entries of 15 April. An assessment panel was due to create a shortlist by the end of June and the people of Herefordshire will have then voted in the summer. But due to the high volume of entries, the shortlisting process took longer than they were anticipating and the vote began in early September after the shortlisted entries were revealed. Everyone in the county aged five and over was allowed to vote. The winning design was revealed on 2 November.

See also 
 Flag of St. Louis

References

Herefordshire
Herefordshire
Herefordshire
Herefordshire